Portrait is the debut album of the R&B group Portrait, released in 1992 on Capitol Records.

The album reached number 70 on the Billboard 200 and number 16 on the US Top R&B Albums chart.

Track listing
 All songs written by Michael Angelo Saulsberry, Eric Kirkland, Philip Johnson and Irving Washington III, except as noted

 "Commitment" – 5:23
 "Honey Dip" – 4:02
 "Here We Go Again!" – 4:27
 "You" (Michael Angelo Saulsberry, Eric Kirkland, Philip Johnson, Irving Washington III, Suamana Brown) – 4:53
 "Interlude: Passion" – 0:53
 "On and On" – 5:31
 "Precious Moments" – 4:41
 "Down Wit Dat" – 4:41
 "Interlude: Snap Along!" – 0:07
 "Problems" – 4:57
 "Feelings" – 3:59
 "Day by Day" – 5:20
 "Heartache" – 4:59
 "Yours Forever" – 5:29
 "Interlude: Why?" (Michael Angelo Saulsberry, Eric Kirkland, Philip Johnson, Irving Washington III, Suamana Brown) – 1:44
 "Here We Go Again!" (Extended Remix) – 5:24

Personnel
 Michael Angelo Saulsberry – producer, writer, all instruments and vocal arrangement
 Eric Kirkland – writer, vocal arrangement and drum programming
 Sekou Bunch – bass guitar
 Irving Washington III – writer, vocals, vocal arrangement 
 Phillip Johnson – writer, vocals
 Thomas Organ – lead guitar, bass guitar, acoustic guitar
 Curtis Bushey – lead guitar
 Ray Brown – trumpet
 Gerald Albright – saxophone
 Bret Bouldin – rap
 Portrait, The Jets, Carolyn Griffey, Tiara LeMacks, Suamana Brown, Dajhi McBeth, E-Luv, M. "Bay" Botiz, Ken "Wolfie" Washington – background vocals
 Gregg Barrett, Fil Brown, Vincent Cirilli, Jon Guggenheim, Donnell Sullivan – recording engineer
 Dave Way, Anthony Jefferies, Donnell Sullivan, Craig Burbidge – mixing
 Ron McMaster, Eddy Schreyer – mastering
 Scott Folks, Joy Bailey – executive producer
 David Roth – photography
 Tommy Steele – art direction
 Bill Burks – design

Charts

References

Portrait (group) albums
1992 debut albums
New jack swing albums